Erik Mørk (3 December 1925 – 27 January 1993) was a Danish film actor. He appeared in 29 films between 1950 and 1993.  He won the Bodil Award for Best Actor in 1950 for his performance in Susanne.

Selected filmography
 Susanne (1950): Bodil Award for Best Actor
 Som sendt fra himlen (1951)
 Relax Freddie (1956)
The Witch Hunt (1981)
 Europa (1991)
 The Russian Singer (1993)

References

External links

1925 births
1993 deaths
Danish male film actors
Male actors from Copenhagen
Best Actor Bodil Award winners
20th-century Danish male actors
Road incident deaths in Denmark